Treat Conrad Huey and Harsh Mankad were the defending champions, however only Huey chose to compete this year.
He partnered with Photos Kallias from Cyprus, but they lost to Gerard Granollers-Pujol and Albert Ramos-Viñolas in the first round.Daniel Muñoz-de la Nava and Santiago Ventura won in the final, against Nikola Ćirić and Guillermo Olaso 6–2, 7–5.

Seeds

Main draw

Draw

References
Main Draw

2010
Doubles